This page documents current and former artists on Century Media Records, as well as its imprint, Another Century.

Century Media artists

Current 

 3Teeth
 77
 Aborted
 Adrenaline Mob
 Angelus Apatrida
 Arch Enemy
 Asphyx
 At the Gates
 Baest
 Beneath the Massacre
 Black Crown Initiate
 Bleed From Within
 Blind Channel
 Body Count
 Bombus
 Borknagar
 Broken Hope
 Buckcherry
 Caliban
 Dark Fortress
 Dark Funeral
 Dark Tranquility
 Deez Nuts
 Deicide
 Electric Callboy
 Enforced
 Entombed A.D.
 Eyehategod
 Feed the Rhino
 Finntroll
 Firespawn
 Fozzy
 Frozen Soul
 Gost
 Grave
 The Haunted
 Havok
 Heaven Shall Burn
 Ignite
 Insomnium
 Jeff Loomis
 Jesus Piece
 Krisiun
 Lacuna Coil
 Lorna Shore
 Lucifer
 Marduk
 Mayhem
 Misery Index
 Monsters Scare You
 Monuments
 Moonsorrow
 Morbid
 Morbus Chron
 Napalm Death
 Oceans of Slumber
 The Offering
 Omnium Gatherum
 Orphaned Land
 Orthodox
 Ov Sulfur
 Otherwise
 Periphery
 Pinkish Black
 The Pretty Reckless 
 Queensrÿche
 Radio Moscow
 Sanctuary
 Sanguisugabogg
 Savage Messiah
 Sick of it All
 Signs of the Swarm
 Spiritworld
 Stitched Up Heart
 Street Dogs
 Suicide Silence
 Swallow the Sun
 Tribulation
 Triptykon
 Turisas
 Unanimated
 Unearth
 Vallenfyre
 Venom Prison
 Vildhjarta
 Voivod
 Vomit Forth
 Witchery
 Witherfall
 Wolf
 Wolves in the Throne Room

Former

 3 Inches of Blood
 454 Big Block
 7 Horns 7 Eyes
 Agents of Man
 The Agony Scene
 Alastis
 All Boro Kings
 ...And Oceans
 Andrew W.K.
 Andromeda
 Angel Dust
 Arcturus
 Armageddon
 Architects
 Arsonists Get All the Girls
 Asphyx
 At All Cost
 Avantasia
 Awaken the Empire
 Ayreon
 Becoming the Archetype
 Behemoth
 Beverly Hellfire
 Black Tongue
 Blessed by a Broken Heart
 Blind Guardian
 Blitzkid
 Bloodbath
 Bob Wayne
 Brand New Sin
 Butcher Babies
 Candiria
 Carnal Forge
 Celtic Frost
 Cemetery 1213
 Chaosbreed
 Children of Bodom
 Chum
 Comecon
 Cro-Mags
 Cronian
 Crows
 Cryptopsy
 Daath
 Daemonarch
 Darkane
 Dead to This World
 Death Wolf
 Demolition Hammer
 Despair
 Despised Icon
 Destiny Potato
 Devil City Angels
 Devian
 Devil Sold His Soul
 Diabolical Masquerade
 Diecast
 Dimension Zero
 Dimmu Borgir
 Divine Empire
 DivineFire
 Divine Heresy
 Dragonland
 Dream Evil
 Earth Crisis
 Ebony Tears
 Einherjer
 Embrace The End
 Emperor
 Enchantment
 Enforsaken
 English Dogs
 Enola Gay
 Entwine
 Even Fall
 Evile
 Evocation
 Exodus
 Extol
 Eyes Set To Kill
 Eyes of Eden
 Eyes of Fire
 Fear My Thoughts
 Firewind
 Fireball Ministry
 Flowing Tears
 Fu Manchu
 The Forsaken
 Gift Giver
 Girl On Fire
 God Forbid
 Gorement
 Gorgoroth
 Graveyard Rodeo
 Grief
 Gurd
 Haste
 Hatesphere
 He Is Legend
 Heart in Hand
 Heart of A Coward
 Helheim
 Hellhammer
 Hexx
 Himsa
 Holy Moses
 Hostility
 House of Spirits
 Iced Earth
 ICS Vortex
 Immolation
 Impaled
 In Flames
 Ingested
 Insidious Disease
 Insult II Injury
 Internal Bleeding
 In This Moment
 Into Eternity
 Into The Flood
 Ion Dissonance
 Intronaut
 Iwrestledabearonce
 Jag Panzer
 Jungle Rot
 Kalmah
 Kivimetsän Druidi
 Kotipelto
 Kypck
 Lions Lions
 Loaded
 Lullacry
 Luna Mortis
 Manntis
 Mariachi Terror
 Maroon
 Martyr Defiled
 Massacre
 Merauder
 Mercenary
 Moonspell
 Morgoth
 Mucky Pup
 My Own Victim
 My Ruin
 Nachtmystium
 Naglfar
 Nebula
 Nevermore
 Nightrage
 Nightwish
 NJ Bloodline
 Nocturnal Rites
 NonExist
 Norma Jean (Non-U.S./Solid State Records)
 Norther
 Oddland
 OLD
 Old Man's Child
 Only Living Witness
 Opeth
 Opiate for the Masses
 Paingod
 Paradise Lost
 Passenger
 Pentagram
 Poisonblack
 Poltergeist
 Radakka
 Rise to Remain
 Rotting Christ
 Royal Hunt
 Rumble Militia
 Ryker's
 Sacramentum
 Samael
 Satyricon
 Savage Circus
 Scar Culture
 Sentenced
 Shadow
 Shadows Fall (resigned in 2007)
 Sleeping Giant
 Sons of Liberty
 Sigh
 Skinlab
 Skyclad
 Soilwork
 Solefald
 Sonata Arctica
 Spineshank
 Stampin' Ground
 Starkill
 Strapping Young Lad
 Stick To Your Guns
 Stuck Mojo
 Subzero
 Sundown
 Suffer Well
 Sworn Enemy
 Taake
 Tad Morose
 Tenet
 Terror
 Terrorizer
 TesseracT
 The Agonist
 The Crown
 The Devastated
 The Forsaken
 The Gathering
 The Man-Eating Tree
 The Showdown (Non-US)
 Theatre of Tragedy
 Throne of Chaos
 Tiamat
 Twilight
 Ulver
 Unleashed
 UnSun
 Vampires Everywhere!
 Vasaria
 Vattnet Viskar
 Venomous Concept
 Vital Remains
 Warbringer
 Warmen
 Warrel Dane
 Watch Them Die
 Waylander
 We Were Gentlemen
 Winds of Plague
 Yakuza
 Zimmers Hole
 Zonaria
 Zonata

Another Century artists

Current 

 Aeges
 American Prophet
 IRONTOM
 Lovelytheband
 Radkey
 The Black Moods
 The Fame Riot
 The Haxans
 The Picturebooks
 The Unlikely Candidates
 The Wrecks
 Varsity Week

Former 

 9ELECTRIC
 Art of Anarchy
 Awaken the Empire
 Fozzy
 Gemini Syndrome
 Like a Storm
 New Years Day
 Otherwise
 Rev Theory
 Righteous Vendetta
 Stitched Up Heart
 Vattica
 XO Stereo

References

External links
 Artists of the Century Media Family

Century Media Records